Gulshan Jha (born 17 February 2006) is a Nepalese cricketer, who plays as bowler for Nepal national team. He became third youngest ODI player, after making his ODI debut against the United States at just 15 years & 212 days of age.

Career
Jha, became viral sensation in social media after his bowling performance in local domestic tournament of Nepal. Despite of playing just two matches in Domestic tournament, Jha was named in Nepal's One Day International (ODI) squad for their series against Papua New Guinea in Oman. He was also named in Nepal's squad for round six of the 2019–2023 ICC Cricket World Cup League 2 tournament, also in Oman. He made his ODI debut on 17 September 2021, for Nepal against the United States. He was also named in Nepal U19s squad for U19 Asia Cup.

In February 2022, he was named in Nepal's Twenty20 International (T20I) squad for the 2022 ICC Men's T20 World Cup Global Qualifier A tournament in Oman. He made his T20I debut on 19 February 2022, for Nepal against the Philippines.

References

External links
 

2006 births
Living people
Nepalese cricketers
Nepal One Day International cricketers
Nepal Twenty20 International cricketers
Place of birth missing (living people)